Gar is a rural locality (a village) in Yenangskoye Rural Settlement, Kichmengsko-Gorodetsky District, Vologda Oblast, Russia. The population was 15 as of 2002.

Geography 
Gar is located 69 km southeast of Kichmengsky Gorodok (the district's administrative centre) by road. Baksheyev Dor is the nearest rural locality.

References 

Rural localities in Kichmengsko-Gorodetsky District